In firearms, downward ejecting refers to firearms which eject spent cases downward from the firearm's receiver, rather than the more conventional designs which eject the brass to the side. This feature simplifies use by left-handers, and can help prevent gases and debris from being ejected near the shooter's face.

Examples

AR-57
Bren light machine gun
Browning BPS shotgun
Browning Semi Automatic 22
Calico Light Weapons Systems
FN P90 submachine gun
Ithaca M37 shotgun
Kel-Tec KS7 shotgun
Kel-Tec KSG shotgun
Kel-Tec RDB rifle
Remington Model 10 shotgun
Remington Model 17 shotgun
Remington Model 105CTi shotgun
Springfield Light Rifle
Smith & Wesson M&P 12 shotgun
Smith & Wesson Model 1940 Light Rifle
American-180 submachine gun

References

Firearms